Stanley B. Greenfield (1922–1987) was a distinguished Anglo-Saxonist. He was a founder of the International Society of Anglo-Saxonists and professor at the University of Oregon. He wrote not only on Anglo-Saxon themes but also later English literature. His 1967, Grammar and meaning in poetry was awarded the 1968 William Riley Parker Prize.  Commenting on his work Brown (1987) notes Greenfield's insistence, when looking at Anglo-Saxon texts,  on "the necessity of going back again and again to the text as source for interpretative strength."

Festschrift
 Rugg Brown, Phylis, Georgia Ronan Crampton, and Fred C. Robinson (1986) Modes of Interpretations in Old English Literature: Essays in honour of Stanley B. Greenfield, University of Toronto Press.

Selected works 

 (1955) The Formulaic Expression of the Theme of" Exile" in Anglo-Saxon Poetry. Speculum, 30(2), 200-206.
 (1967) Grammar and Meaning in Poetry. Publications of the Modern Language Association of America, 377-387.
 (1972) The Interpretation of Old English Poems. Routledge Kegan & Paul.
 (1989) Hero & Exile: Art of Old English Poetry. Bloomsbury. 
 (1996) A New Critical History of Old English Literature, with Daniel G. Calder. NYU Press.

References

1922 births
1987 deaths
Anglo-Saxon studies scholars
University of Oregon faculty